Carrollwood is a census-designated place (CDP) in northwestern Hillsborough County, Florida, United States. The population was 33,365 at the 2010 census. The census area includes the unincorporated communities of Carrollwood and Carrollwood Village. For the 2000 census the area was enumerated under the name "Greater Carrollwood" and had a population of 33,519. A similar area was listed as "Lake Carroll" in 1970 and 1980; for the 1990 census it was split into the smaller Carrollwood and Carrollwood Village CDPs.

ZIP codes 
The ZIP Codes encompassing the CDP area are 33612, 33618 and 33624.

Geography
The Carrollwood CDP is bordered by Citrus Park to the west, Egypt Lake-Leto and Town 'n' Country to the south, Northdale to the north and Lake Magdalene and Forest Hills (Tampa) to the east. The CDP borders follow West Busch Boulevard and a CSX rail line on the south; Anderson Road and Lynn Road on the west; County Road 582 (Ehrlich Road) on the north; and State Road 597 (N. Dale Mabry Highway), Fletcher Avenue, and N. Armenia Avenue on the east to the Tampa border.

Lake Carroll, Lake Ellen, Lake Lipsey, White Trout Lake, and Boat Lake are in the eastern part of the CDP.

Demographics

As of the 2010 census, there were 33,365 people, 14,141 households, and 8,957 families residing in the CDP. The racial makeup of the community was 80.8% White, 7.8% African American, 0.2% Native American, 3.8% Asian, 0.05% Pacific Islander, 4.0% from some other race, and 3.3% from two or more races. Hispanics or Latinos were 27.4% of the population.

There were 14,141 households, out of which 29.1% had children under the age of 18 living with them, 45.9% were headed by married couples living together, 13.1% had a female householder with no husband present, and 36.7% were non-families. 29.1% of all households were made of persons living alone, and 8.6% were someone living alone who was 65 years of age or older. The average household size was 2.36, and the average family size was 2.93.

In the community the population was spread out, with 20.7% under the age of 18, 8.4% from 18 to 24, 26.3% from 25 to 44, 30.3% from 45 to 64, and 14.2% who were 65 years of age or older. The median age was 41.3 years. For every 100 females, there were 90.2 males. For every 100 females age 18 and over, there were 86.8 males.

For the period 2011 through 2015, the estimated median annual income for a household in the community was $62,266, and the median income for a family was $75,297. Male full-time workers had a median income of $50,575 versus $40,490 for females. The per capita income for the community was $35,090. About 7.1% of families and 9.6% of the population were below the poverty line, including 11.6% of those under age 18 and 7.0% of those age 65 or over.

Education
The schools that serve the area are the following:
Cannella Elementary School
Carrollwood Elementary School
Essrig Elementary School
Hill Middle School
Chamberlain High School
Gaither High School
Leto High School
Corbett Preparatory School of IDS

References

External links
Carrollwood Village official website

Census-designated places in Hillsborough County, Florida
Census-designated places in Florida